Claudio De Pascalis (born July 7, 1982 in Squinzano) is an Italian footballer

External links
 A.S. Bari Official Player Profile
 Profile by tuttocalciatori.net

1982 births
Living people
Italian footballers
Serie B players
S.S.C. Bari players
A.S. Noicattaro Calcio players
Cosenza Calcio players
Association football midfielders
Sportspeople from the Province of Lecce
Footballers from Apulia
21st-century Italian people